Joseph Marsh (1726–1811) was an American revolutionary.

Joseph or Joe Marsh may also refer to:

Joseph Marsh (Adventist) (1802–1863), American Millerite Protestant preacher
Joe Marsh (footballer), English footballer
Joe Marsh (ice hockey) (born 1951), Canadian ice hockey coach
Joe Marsh (bowls) (born 1928), South African lawn bowler
Joseph Marsh (priest) (1803–1838), Scottish Anglican priest and educationist